The 2016–17 Kategoria e Dytë is being competed between 26 teams in 2 groups, A and B, respectively.

Changes from last season

Team changes

From Kategoria e Dytë
Promoted to Kategoria e Parë:
 Shënkolli
 Tomori

To Kategoria e Dytë
Relegated from Kategoria e Parë:
 Ada
 Butrinti

Promoted from Kategoria e Tretë:
 Kukësi B
 Vllaznia B

Participating teams
Group A 

Group B

League tables

Group A

Group B

Final

References

3
2016–17 in European third tier association football leagues
Kategoria e Dytë seasons